Since the first season of the Philippines Football League, league matches have been played in 11 stadiums from as far north as Bantay in Ilocos Sur and as far south as Tagum in Davao del Norte. While matches of the original United Football League were only played in Metro Manila due to the status of the league, the establishment of the PFL in 2016 saw its teams spread over the Philippines with designated home stadiums. This relocation also saw the record capacity for a PFL match in the Philippines, with over 5,000 people attending a match between Global Cebu and Ceres–Negros in Cebu City.

Due to the COVID-19 pandemic in the Philippines, however, matches since 2020 have been played only at one venue, the PFF National Training Center in Carmona, Cavite, due to the low cost as well as for safety purposes. However, the league plans to hold matches in stadiums again due to the lowering of cases when the 2022 season kicks off in mid-2022.

Stadiums
Stadiums whose names are in bold indicate stadiums of teams that are currently participating in the 2022 Philippines Football League.

References

Football venues in the Philippines
Buildings and structures in the Philippines